Vikings' River Splash is a ride at Legoland Windsor.  It opened in 2007, later than expected because of construction delays. The ride is a river rapids ride which is a common attraction in many theme parks. The ride is in the "Land of the Vikings" area of the park.

The ride features Lego models, water sprays and cannons along its course. The ride time is about three minutes and is one of the most popular rides in the park.

See also
 Pirate Falls Treasure Quest

References 

Amusement rides introduced in 2007
Legoland